Saleh Emara (born 1 June 1982 in Monufia) is an Egyptian freestyle wrestler. He qualified to compete in the freestyle 96 kg event at the 2012 Summer Olympics, but he and fellow Egyptian wrestler Abdou Omar Abdou Ahmed forfeited their only matches after showing up late to their events.

References

External links
 

1982 births
Living people
Olympic wrestlers of Egypt
Wrestlers at the 2008 Summer Olympics
Wrestlers at the 2012 Summer Olympics
Egyptian male sport wrestlers
Mediterranean Games gold medalists for Egypt
Competitors at the 2009 Mediterranean Games
Mediterranean Games medalists in wrestling
People from Monufia Governorate
20th-century Egyptian people
21st-century Egyptian people